Romat is a pharmaceutical company and Kazakhstan's leading pharmaceutical brand.

"Romat" is a pharmaceutical holding, uniting 3 modern plants for the manufacture of bio-products and polymeric medical products. 

The research and development department of "Romat" is working on tuberculous vaccines and other products.

The company possesses a national distribution network with branches in 18 cities of Kazakhstan and in China and a retail network of 30 pharmacies in 5 cities of Kazakhstan. Current staff size exceeds 1200 people. The main activities of “Romat” are manufacturing and sale of medical products, personal hygiene products, children's nutrition and syringes.

References

External links 
Official website in English

Pharmaceutical companies of Kazakhstan
Pharmaceutical companies established in 1992
Generic drug manufacturers
Kazakhstani brands